Rojasia is a group of plants in the family Apocynaceae first described as a genus in 1905. , Plants of the World Online accepted two species:
Rojasia bornmuelleri (Schltr. ex Malme) Fontella, S.A.Cáceres & R.Santos
Rojasia gracilis (Morong) Malme

References

Asclepiadoideae
Apocynaceae genera
Taxa named by Gustaf Oskar Andersson Malme